José Alejandro de Aycinena y Carrillo (24 April 1767 – 26 May 1826) was a Spanish military officer and politician who served as the Colonial Intendant of the Intendancy of San Salvador from 1811 to 1812.

Early and personal life 

José Alejandro de Aycinena y Carrillo was born on 24 April 1767 in Antigua Guatemala, Guatemala, which was then a part of the Spanish Empire. His father was Juan Fermín de Aycinena e Irigoyen (es), a member of the conservative Aycinena Family (es), and his mother was Ana María Carrillo y Gálvez de Corral. He was the Rector of the M. I. University of Guatemala and the Attorney of the Real Audiencia of Guatemala.

Military career 

Aycinena y Carrillo was a Colonel in the Spanish Army and was in command of the Milicias de Infantería (Infantry Militias). On 5 November 1811, 400 Salvadorans lead by José Matías Delgado and Manuel José Arce in the Intendancy of San Salvador declared independence and overthrew its Colonial Intendant, Antonio Gutiérrez y Ulloa. Gutiérrez y Ulloa was replaced by José Mariano Batres y Asturias by the independence leaders. Aycinena y Carrillo was sent into San Salvador to crush the rebellion.  On 3 December 1811, after suppressing the independence movement, Aycinena y Carrillo became the Colonial Intendant of San Salvador to bring "tranquility and betterment" to the intendancy. His term as Colonial Intendant ended in August 1812 when he was elected as Advisor of the State of the Real Audiencia of Guatemala, being replaced by José María Peinado y Pezonarte.

Death 

Aycinena y Carrillo died on 26 May 1826.

References

Citations

Bibliography 

1767 births
1826 deaths
Salvadoran politicians
Guatemalan politicians
Guatemalan military personnel
Salvadoran military personnel
18th-century Spanish military personnel
Mayors of San Salvador
19th-century Spanish military personnel